Ras Ali is an Arab village in northern Israel. Located to the south of Shefa-'Amr, it falls under the jurisdiction of Zevulun Regional Council.

History
In  the 1945 statistics  Ras Ali was counted among  Shefa-'Amr  suburbs, and it was noted with a population of  80 Muslims.

References

Bibliography

External links
 Welcome To Kh. Ras Ali

Arab villages in Israel
Populated places in Haifa District
Populated places established in 1927
1927 establishments in Mandatory Palestine